Brodie Spencer (born 6 May 2004) is a Northern Irish professional footballer who plays for Huddersfield Town.

Club career
Spencer signed for Huddersfield Town in 2020 from Cliftonville, joining their B Team.

International career
Brodie Spencer made his international debut for Northern Ireland on 5 June 2022 in a 2022–23 UEFA Nations League match against Kosovo, where he provided an assist for Northern Ireland's first goal, but they still lost 3–2.

References

External links

2004 births
Living people
Association footballers from Northern Ireland
Northern Ireland youth international footballers
Northern Ireland international footballers
Association football defenders
Huddersfield Town A.F.C. players